The El Encanto fire was a terrorist arson attack that destroyed a department store in central Havana on 13 April 1961.

History
El Encanto was the largest department store in Cuba, with five retail storeys, originally built in 1888, and situated on the corner of Galiano and San Rafael in Old Havana. Before the Cuban Revolution, it had been privately owned, but in 1959 it was nationalized. In 1961, it had about 930 employees. On 9 April 1961, a bomb exploded outside the store, near the main entrance, resulting in broken windows of several stores in the same street.

Incident
At 6:00 pm on 13 April 1961, the store closed as usual. At about 7:00 pm, two incendiary devices exploded in the tailoring department. The next day, the charred body of Fe del Valle was found in the rubble, other casualties being recorded as 18 people injured. Fe del Valle had been a supervisor in the children's department, and had evidently been attempting to recover money donated to the Federation of Cuban Women for the construction of a day care center for children of store employees; she had become trapped, and was overcome by dense smoke.

Police investigation
At about midnight on 13 April 1961, in the district of Baracoa Beach, west of Havana, militiamen observed lights being flashed from land towards the sea. Nearby houses were searched, and Carlos González Vidal was recognized by an officer as an employee of the store, in its record department. He was arrested and transferred to State Security, where colonel Oscar Gámez identified him as a principal suspect. Carlos González confessed to the action of setting the two incendiary bombs, and provided details of the devices, events and people involved in assisting him. He recounted that Jorge Camellas (aka "Cawy"), a CIA agent, had been infiltrated into Cuba with a consignment of C-4 plastic explosives from Miami. Mario Pombo Matamoros, chief of the Movimiento Revolutionario del Pueblo (MRP, or People's Revolutionary Movement), outlined the arson plan to Carlos, who had been recruited by his uncle Reynold González, CIA agent and a leader of the MRP. At about 2:00 pm on 13 April 1961, via Dalia Jorge, Arturo Martinez Pagalday supplied Carlos with two sets of C-4 explosive in packs of Eden cigarettes. After the store closed at 6:00 pm, Carlos planted the devices within bolts of cloth in the tailoring department, then departed with the intention of escaping by boat that night. Carlos González Vidal was later tried, sentenced to death, and executed by firing squad.

Legacy
The former site of the department store is now the location of the Fe del Valle park.

See also
Bay of Pigs Invasion

Notes

References
Rodriguez, Juan Carlos. 1999. Bay of Pigs and the CIA. Ocean Press 
Wyden, Peter. 1979. Bay of Pigs - The Untold Story. Simon and Schuster   

1961 crimes in Cuba
1961 fires in North America
Terrorist incidents in Cuba
Arson in Cuba
1960s in Havana
Crime in Havana
1961 murders in North America
Terrorist incidents in North America in 1961
Attacks on shopping malls